The paradox vole ('Microtus paradoxus'') is a species of rodent in the family Cricetidae found in southern Turkmenistan.

References

 D.E. Wilson & D.M. Reeder, 2005: Mammal Species of the World: A Taxonomic and Geographic Reference. Third Edition. The Johns Hopkins University Press, Baltimore.

Microtus
Mammals described in 1928